In Mormonism, a prayer circle, also known as the true order of prayer, is a ritual established by Joseph Smith that some Mormons believe is a more potent method of prayer that can lead to receiving greater blessings and revelation from God. The ritual involves forming a circle of participants around a person who offers a prayer, usually at an altar in a temple. The members of the circle repeat the words of the prayer. 

Mormon prayer circles were once organized by local congregations on a monthly schedule, but in the late 1970s were restricted only to temples.

Origin of Mormon prayer circles

Prayer circles were common in the Protestant revivals of the Second Great Awakening that occurred in the youth of Smith. Ritual circles were also practiced in Freemasonry, to which Smith had been initiated in 1842 by Abraham Jonas.  Early Mormons practiced conventional Protestant-type prayer circles at least as early as 1833.

On May 4, 1842, Smith met with nine other men and performed the first endowment ceremony. It is not clear whether this ceremony included a prayer circle. However, prayer circles became the main purpose of meetings of the Anointed Quorum beginning on May 26, 1843. Women were first included in the ceremony on September 28, 1843.

Within The Church of Jesus Christ of Latter-day Saints
After Smith's death, The Church of Jesus Christ of Latter-day Saints (LDS Church) continued to practice prayer circles in its temples. In addition, local stake and ward prayer circles were organized and conducted until May 3, 1978, when the church's First Presidency announced that all prayer circles should be discontinued except those performed in a temple as part of the endowment. The reason for this change is not known, but could have resulted in part from the growth of the LDS Church, and the fact that prayer circles were usually organized by a member of the First Presidency or the Quorum of the Twelve Apostles. Only members who had received the endowment could participate in prayer circles outside of the temple.

Within Mormon fundamentalism
Amongst some Mormon fundamentalists, such as the Apostolic United Brethren, prayer circles within temples, endowment houses, and homes are still common.

See also

 Prayer in Mormonism

Notes

References

.
: Excerpts.
.
.

External links
ldsendowment.org (a detailed, but respectful, source of information about the Endowment ceremony).

All articles with unsourced statements
Christian prayer
Latter Day Saint temple practices
Latter Day Saint terms
1843 in Christianity
1843 establishments in Illinois